Stene is a surname. Notable people with the surname include:

Andreas Stene (born 1991), Norwegian ice hockey player
Helga Stene (1904–1983), Norwegian educator, feminist and resistance member
Nic Stene (1921–2006), Norwegian speed skater
Øyvind Stene (born 1947), Norwegian engineer and businessperson
Randi Stene (born 1963), Norwegian opera singer and mezzo soprano
Robert Stene (born 1983), Norwegian soccer player
Vibeke Stene (born 1978), Norwegian soprano

See also
Stene, Belgium
Stene Point, South Orkney Islands
Steane
Steene